Lucas Mondelo García (born 28 July 1967) is a Spanish basketball coach for Toyota Antelopes and the Spain women's national team.

Coach career
As a club coach, Mondelo first coached professionally at Club Bàsquet Olesa from Olesa de Montserrat in the season 2006-07, promoting to the first tier league in his first year. In 2010 he signed for one of the strongest teams in Spain, Perfumerías Avenida, winning the 2011 Spanish League, the 2010–11 EuroLeague Women and the 2012 Spanish Cup. He had his first experience abroad in China, coaching the newly-promoted Shanxi Xing Rui Flame, and winning three times the Chinese women's championship. In 2016, he signed with Russian club Dynamo Kursk, winning the 2017 EuroLeague with an 18-0 record and the 2018 Russian Cup. Mondelo was deprived of more titles by UMMC Ekaterinburg, being runner-up to them in the 2017, 2018 and 2019 Russian League, as well as being defeated at the 2018 EuroLeague and the 2019 EuroLeague Final Fours.

International career
In 2009, Mondelo coached the under-19 women's team. The team achieved the silver medal in the 2009 World Championship. In 2010, Mondelo became manager of the Spanish women's under-20 team. He led the team to the silver medal in the 2010 Under-20 European championship and also to win the 2011 edition.

Mondelo became the Spanish women's team national coach in 2012, after the team failed to qualify for the 2012 London Olympics. He coached the senior national team to seven consecutive medals from 2013 to 2019:

  2009 FIBA Under-19 World Championship (youth)
  2010 FIBA Europe Under-20 Championship (youth) 
  2011 FIBA Europe Under-20 Championship (youth) 
  2013 Eurobasket
  2014 World Championship 
  2015 Eurobasket
  2016 Summer Olympics
  2017 Eurobasket
  2018 World Championship
  2019 Eurobasket

In October 2020, Mondelo announced that he will remain as head coach of the team through the Paris 2024 Olympics.

See also 
 List of EuroBasket Women winning head coaches

References

External links

1967 births
Living people
Spanish basketball coaches
Spanish expatriate sportspeople in China
Spanish expatriate sportspeople in Russia
Sportspeople from Barcelona
Spanish expatriate basketball people in China
Spanish expatriate basketball people in Russia
Catalan basketball coaches
Spanish Olympic coaches